Notonecta lobata is a species of backswimmer in the family Notonectidae. It is found in Central America and North America.

References

Notonecta
Articles created by Qbugbot
Insects described in 1925